Holidays by the Sea is a 2011 French comedy film directed by Pascal Rabaté. The film is a cinematic rendering of a comic that Rabaté himself wrote. Like in some films of Jacques Tati, the characters use expressions and gestures instead of dialogues to communicate between them.

Plot
The plot of the film intertwines various unrelated characters and stories of ordinary people on their way to and spending their holidays at a seaside resort.

Cast
 Jacques Gamblin as Monsieur Cerf-volant
 Maria de Medeiros as Madame Collier
 François Damiens as Monsieur Fraises
 François Morel as The man in the tent
 Dominique Pinon as The man in the trailer
 Gustave Kervern as Green golfer
 Marie Kremer as The orphan
 Chantal Neuwirth as The widow
 Catherine Hosmalin as House's woman

Accolades
The film was nominated for the Crystal Globe at the 46th Karlovy Vary International Film Festival and Rabaté won the Best Director Award. It was also nominated for the International Jury Award as Best Feature Film at the São Paulo International Film Festival.

References

External links
 

2011 films
2011 comedy films
French comedy films
2010s French-language films
2010s French films